is an airport in Kumejima, a city and island in the Okinawa Prefecture of Japan.

The prefecture operates the airport, which is classified as a third class airport.

Airlines and destinations

References

External links
 Kumejima Airport
 Kumejima Airport Guide from Japan Airlines
 
 

Airports in Okinawa
Kumejima, Okinawa